On 23 January 2020, the central government of China imposed a lockdown in Wuhan and other cities in Hubei in an effort to quarantine the center of an outbreak of COVID-19; this action was commonly referred to as the Wuhan lockdown. The World Health Organization (WHO), although stating that it was beyond its own guidelines, commended the move, calling it "unprecedented in public health history".

The lockdown in Wuhan set the precedent for similar measures in other Chinese cities. Within hours of the Wuhan lockdown, travel restrictions were also imposed on the nearby cities of Huanggang and Ezhou, and were eventually imposed on all 15 other cities in Hubei, affecting a total of about 57 million people. On 2 February 2020, Wenzhou, Zhejiang, implemented a seven-day lockdown in which only one person per household was allowed to exit once each two days, and most of the highway exits were closed. On 13 March 2020, Huangshi and Qianjiang became the first Hubei cities to remove strict travel restrictions within part or all of their administrative confines. On 8 April 2020, the Wuhan lockdown officially ended. The lockdown, combined with other public health measures in early 2020, succeeded in suppressing virus transmission and averted a more widespread outbreak in China.

Subsequent lockdowns were introduced in other regions of China in response to localised outbreaks during the two years following. The largest of these was Shanghai in early 2022.

Some Western observers, such as Amnesty International, were initially skeptical of the lockdown; however, as the COVID-19 pandemic spread to other countries and territories, similar measures were enacted around the globe.

A series of protests in mainland China against COVID-19 lockdowns began in November 2022.

On 7 December 2022, China's National Health Commission in a 10-point announcement stipulated that negative COVID-19 tests would no longer be required, apart from vulnerable areas such as nurseries, elderly care facilities and schools.

Background 
Wuhan is the capital of Hubei province in China. With a population of over 11 million, it is the largest city in Hubei, the most populous city in Central China, the seventh-most populous Chinese city, and one of the nine National Central Cities of China. Wuhan lies in the eastern Jianghan Plain, on the confluence of the Yangtze River and its largest tributary, the Han River. It is a major transportation hub, with dozens of railways, roads and expressways passing through the city and connecting to other major cities. Because of its key role in domestic transport, Wuhan is known as the "Nine Provinces' Thoroughfare" and sometimes referred to as "the Chicago of China".

2020 lockdowns

Hubei

In mid-December 2019 the Chinese Government acknowledged an emerging cluster of people, many linked to the Huanan Seafood Wholesale Market in Wuhan, were infected with pneumonia with no clear causes. Chinese scientists subsequently linked the pneumonia to a new strain of coronavirus that was given the initial designation 2019 novel coronavirus (2019-nCoV). Some of the first symptoms appeared on 10 December, and 24 cases were later discovered to have connection to the seafood market.

On 10 January 2020, the first death and 41 clinically confirmed infections caused by the coronavirus were reported.

By 22 January, the novel coronavirus had spread to major cities and provinces in China, with 571 confirmed cases and 17 deaths reported. Confirmed cases were also reported in other regions and countries, including Hong Kong, Macau, Taiwan, Thailand, Japan, South Korea, and the United States.

According to Li Lanjuan, a professor at Zhejiang University's school of medicine and member of the high-level expert team convened by the National Health Commission, she had urged a lockdown on Wuhan on several occasions between 19 January and 22 January 2020 as a last resort to contain the epidemic.

At 2am on 23 January, authorities issued a notice informing residents of Wuhan that from 10am, all public transport, including buses, railways, flights, and ferry services would be suspended. The Wuhan Airport, the Wuhan railway station, and the Wuhan Metro were all closed. The residents of Wuhan were also not allowed to leave the city without permission from the authorities. The notice caused an exodus from Wuhan. An estimated 300,000 people were reported to have left Wuhan by train alone before the 10 am lockdown. By the afternoon of 23 January, the authorities began shutting down some of the major highways leaving Wuhan. The lockdown came two days before the Chinese New Year, the most important festival in the country, and traditionally the peak traveling season, when millions of Chinese travel across the country.

Following the lockdown of Wuhan, public transportation systems in two of Wuhan's neighboring prefecture-level cities, Huanggang and Ezhou, were also placed on lockdown. A total of 12 other county to prefecture-level cities in Hubei, including Huangshi, Jingzhou, Yichang, Xiaogan, Jingmen, Suizhou, Xianning, Qianjiang, Xiantao, Shiyan, Tianmen and Enshi, were placed on traveling restrictions by the end of 24 January, bringing the number of people affected by the restriction to more than 50 million.

Lockdown timeline
23 January, transport in Wuhan, Huanggang and Ezhou severely restricted, including closure of public transit, trains, airports, and major highways
24 January, travel restrictions enacted in 12 additional prefecture-level cities in Hubei
13 February, the Chinese government has issued extension of order to shut down all non-essential companies, including manufacturing plants, in Hubei Province until at least 24:00 20 February.
20 February, the Chinese government has issued extension of order to shut down all non-essential companies, including manufacturing plants, and all schools in Hubei Province until at least 24:00 10 March.
13 March: Huangshi removes controls and permits on road traffic within its urban area; Qianjiang does the same for its entire administrative area.
14 March: Hubei Sanitation and Health Committee Vice-chairperson Liu Dongru announces that only Wuhan remains a "high-risk area", and that the entirety of the rest of the province is considered medium- or "low-risk areas". Any low-risk township-level divisions, in addition to those medium- and high-risk divisions with no confirmed active cases, could lift their blockades and other mobility controls. Per China News Service reporting, by 14 March, besides the aforementioned Huangshi and Qianjiang, Yichang, Huanggang, Suizhou, Xiantao, Jingzhou, Jingmen, Shiyan, Xiangyang, Tianmen and Shennongjia had announced "measures to lessen controls" and for industries to incrementally resume work and production.
17 March: Jingzhou removes its permit requirements for transport, resuming normal transport operations, and also removes entry/exit controls on xiaoqu.
18 March: The Hubei taskforce to control COVID-19 announces that, with the exception of exit/entry into Wuhan and the province as a whole, all anti-COVID-19 traffic checkpoints within the province are to be removed.
22 March: Wuhan loosens its two-month lockdown.
25 March: Hubei lifts the lockdown outside of Wuhan, although people will still need to confirm their "Green Code" health classification, designated by Alipay's monitoring system, to travel.
8 April: Wuhan lifts its lockdown, resumes all transportation, with residents intending to leave the city facing similar "Green Code" requirements as those in the rest of the province.

Elsewhere in China

Lockdowns by outdoor restrictions 
On 1 February in Huanggang, Hubei implemented a measure whereby only one person from each household is permitted to go outside for provisions once every two days, except for medical reasons or to work at shops or pharmacies. Many cities, districts, and counties across mainland China implemented similar measures in the days following, including Wenzhou, Hangzhou, Fuzhou, Harbin, and the whole of Jiangxi.

Closed management of communities 
Many areas across China have implemented what is called "closed management" on a community-basis. In most of the areas where this came into effect, villages, communities, and units in most areas would only keep one entrance and exit point open, and each household is allowed limited numbers of entrances and exits. In some places, night-time access is prohibited, effectively a curfew, and in extreme cases, access is prohibited throughout the day. People entering and leaving are required to wear masks and receive temperature tests. In some areas, vouchers are issued to the public, with vouchers and valid credentials. There are also areas where people are allowed to declare on WeChat mini-programs or public accounts and some apps at the same time. Courier and food delivery personnel are usually prohibited from entering. Control in communities with confirmed cases is more stringent.

List by the time of official announcement:

Impacts and reactions 
The exodus from Wuhan before the lockdown resulted in angry responses on the Chinese microblogging website Sina Weibo from residents in other cities who were concerned that it could result in spreading of the novel coronavirus to their cities. Some in Wuhan were concerned with the availability of provisions and especially medical supplies during the lockdown.

The World Health Organization called the Wuhan lockdown "unprecedented" and said it showed "how committed the authorities are to contain a viral breakout". However, WHO clarified that the move was not a recommendation that WHO had made and authorities have to wait and see how effective it is. The WHO separately stated that the possibility of locking down an entire city in this way was "new to science".

The CSI 300 Index, an aggregate measure of the top 300 stocks in the Shanghai and Shenzhen stock exchanges, dropped almost 3% on 23 January 2020, the biggest single-day loss in almost 9 months, after the Wuhan lockdown was announced as investors reacting to the drastic measure sought safe haven for their investments.

The unprecedented scale of this lockdown generated controversy, and at least one expert criticized this measure as "risky business" that "could very easily backfire" by forcing otherwise healthy people in Wuhan to stay in close conditions with infected people. Drawing a cordon sanitaire around a city of 11 million people raises ethical concerns. It also drew comparisons to the lockdown of the poor West Point neighbourhood in Liberia during the 2014 ebola outbreak, which was lifted after ten days.

The lockdown caused panic in the city of Wuhan, and many expressed concern about the city's ability to cope with the outbreak. At the time, some experts questioned whether the large costs of such a vast lockdown, both financially and in terms of personal liberty, would translate to effective infection control. Medical historian Howard Markel argued that the Chinese government "may now be overreacting, imposing an unjustifiable burden on the population," and said that "incremental restrictions, enforced steadily and transparently, tend to work far better than draconian measures." Others, such as Anthony Fauci, director of the National Institute of Allergy and Infectious Diseases, defended the intent behind the lockdowns, saying that they have bought the world a "delay to essentially prepare better." Mathematical epidemiologist Gerardo Chowell of Georgia State University stated that based on mathematical modelling, "containment strategies implemented in China are successfully reducing transmission."

However, as the global COVID-19 pandemic worsened, similar lockdown measures were enacted around the world. After northern Italy became a new hotspot of the outbreak in late February, the Italian government has enacted what has been called a "Wuhan-style lockdown," by quarantining nearly a dozen towns of 50,000 people in the provinces of Lombardy and Veneto. Iran, another developing hotspot for the coronavirus as of 25 February, has come under calls to assume similar lockdown procedures as China and Italy. Security experts such as Gal Luft of the Institute for the Analysis of Global Security in Washington, have said that "The best way for Iran to deal with the disease is to do precisely what China has done – quarantine." and that "If Wuhan with its 11 million population can be under quarantine, so can Tehran with its 8 million"

By late 2020, public health experts estimated that the Wuhan lockdown prevented between 500,000 and 3 million infections and between 18,000 and 70,000 deaths. A November 2021 study examining data from the first half of 2020 estimated that over 347,000 deaths may have been prevented in China by COVID-19 prevention measures from 1 January 2020, to 31 July 2020. The estimate does not solely include deaths that would have occurred due to COVID-19. It includes deaths that were inadvertently prevented, such as from traffic collisions or air pollution.

See also
2022 COVID-19 protests in China
2022 Ürümqi fire

References 

Lockdown
2020 in China
Responses to the COVID-19 pandemic in 2020
Containment efforts related to the COVID-19 pandemic
History of Wuhan
China